Erhard's wall lizard (Podarcis erhardii), also commonly called the Aegean wall lizard, is a species of lizard in the family Lacertidae. The species is endemic to Southeast Europe.

Etymology
The specific name, erhardii, is in honor of a certain Dr. D. Erhard (first name unknown), a German naturalist, who was the author of Fauna der Cycladen (1858).

Geographic range
P. erhardii is found in the Balkan peninsula and the Aegean islands. On the mainland it ranges from Albania, North Macedonia and southern Bulgaria to the northeastern part of the Peloponnese peninsula in Greece. In the Aegean archipelago it does not occur in Milos or the surrounding islands, where it is replaced by the Milos wall lizard.

Description

The head is rather wide, and the skin is smooth. The colour and patterning of this species vary a lot. The main colour is typically grey or brown, sometimes green. Females particularly are often striped. On the edges of the back two white stripes border two dark stripes or spotty lines. In the middle of the back may be a dark line. Some males have net-like patterning, where longitudinal and transverse lines and spots mix. The belly and often throat are white, yellow, orange or red, and in the Aegean Islands also green, blue or grey. The belly is never spotty, but sometimes there are blue spots on the hind legs.

Habitat
Erhard's wall lizard lives in dry or rocky places with dense, low bushes. It climbs very well. The lizard populations in the Aegean archipelago inhabit open places, like plant-covered dunes, as well.

Diet
Erhard's wall lizard eats arthropods, especially insects.

Reproduction
P. erhardii mates in spring, and lays eggs at the beginning of the summer.

Behaviour
P. erhardii chooses backgrounds that match its colour to enhance camouflage against avian predators in its natural habitat.

Subspecies
Although 28 subspecies of P. erhardii have been described and considered valid, Sindaco & Jeremčenko (2008) consider only four subspecies to be valid, including the nominotypical subspecies.
Podarcis erhardii erhardii 
Podarcis erhardii livadiacus 
Podarcis erhardii riveti 
Podarcis erhardii thessalicus 
 Podarcis erhardii ruthvenii 
Nota bene: A trinomial authority in parentheses indicates that the subspecies was originally described in a genus other than Podarcis.

References

Further reading
Arnold EN, Burton JA (1978). A Field Guide to Reptiles and Amphibians of Britain and Europe. London: Collins 272 pp. + Plates 1-40. . (Podarcis erhardii, p. 171 + Plate 31 + Map 90).
Bedriaga J (1882). "Die Amphibien und Reptilien Griechenlands ". Bulletin de la Société impériale des naturalistes de Moscou 56 (2): 43-103. (Lacerta muralis fusca var. erhardii, new variation, p. 99). (in German).
Čihař, Jiří (1994). Amphibians and Reptiles: A Magna Field Guide. Wigston, England: Magna Books. 192 pp. .
Sindaco, Roberto; Jeremčenko, Valery K. (2008). The Reptiles of the Western Palearctic. 1. Annotated Checklist and Distributional Atlas of the Turtles, Crocodiles, Amphisbaenians and Lizards of Europe, North Africa, Middle East and Central Asia. (Monographs of the Societas Herpetologica Italica). Latina, Italy: Edizioni Belvedere. 580 pp. .

External links
Amphibians and Reptiles of Europe
 Database entry includes a range map and a brief justification of why this species is of least concern

Podarcis
Lizards of Europe
Reptiles described in 1882
Taxa named by Jacques von Bedriaga